The 2023 Pala Casino 400 was a NASCAR Cup Series race that was held on February 26, 2023, at Auto Club Speedway in Fontana, California. It was contested over 200 laps on the  D-shaped oval and it was the second race of the 2023 NASCAR Cup Series season. It was the final race on the 2 mile oval as it will not be on the 2024 schedule due to the track being renovated into a 0.5 mile short track in 2024

Report

Background

It is also used for open wheel racing events. The racetrack is located near the former locations of Ontario Motor Speedway and Riverside International Raceway. The track is owned and operated by International Speedway Corporation and is the only track owned by ISC to have naming rights sold. The speedway is served by the nearby Interstate 10 and Interstate 15 freeways as well as a Metrolink station located behind the backstretch.

Entry list
 (R) denotes rookie driver.
 (i) denotes driver who is ineligible for series driver points.

Practice
Practice was cancelled due to inclement weather.

Qualifying
Qualifying was cancelled due to inclement weather. Christopher Bell was awarded the pole for the race as a result of NASCAR's "pandemic formula" with a score of 4.250.

Pandemic Formula
Since the August 2020 Daytona Grand Prix, NASCAR has used a formula to determine the starting field for races when qualifying was not held, as was the case for most of the 2020 season and 2021 season, and if inclement weather prevents qualification rounds to be held.  Currently, it is used to determine qualifying order and practice order (which is grouped into odd and even based on ranking), and if necessary, determines starting fields in case of cancellations.  

The formula is based on the 2023 owner points standings and the results of the previous race on the schedule.  The finishing order from the driver counts as 25% of the score, and the entrant (as in car number) finish counts as 25% of the score.  35% of the score is based on the current owner points standings (counting the final result of the race and the top ten bonus points from qualifying races and the top ten drivers on Lap 65 and 130), and 15% of the order is based on the driver's fastest lap ranking from the race.  If a driver did not participate, they are scored 41st place in driver finish and fastest lap.  If a team used a driver ineligible for Cup Series points, the points earned by the driver will still be awarded to the car owner for purposes of this formula.

Starting Lineup

Race

Race results

Stage Results

Stage One
Laps: 65

Stage Two
Laps: 65

Final Stage Results

Stage Three
Laps: 70

Race statistics
 Lead changes: 28 among 13 different drivers
 Cautions/Laps: 8 for 38 laps
 Red flags: 0
 Time of race: 3 hours, 8 minutes and 5 seconds
 Average speed:

Media

Television
The race was the 22nd race Fox Sports covered at the Auto Club Speedway. Mike Joy, Clint Bowyer and three-time NASCAR Cup Series champion, two-time Fontana winner and co-owner of Stewart-Haas Racing Tony Stewart called the race in the booth for Fox. Jamie Little and Regan Smith handled the pit road duties, and Larry McReynolds provided insight from the Fox Sports studio in Charlotte.

Radio
MRN had the radio call for the race, which was also simulcast on Sirius XM NASCAR Radio. Alex Hayden, Jeff Striegle, and 2018 NASCAR Cup Championship crew chief Todd Gordon called the race from the booth when the field raced their way down the front stretch. Dan Hubbard called the race from a billboard outside turn 2 when the field raced their way through turns 1 and 2, and Kyle Rickey called the race from a billboard outside turn 3 when the field raced their way through turns 3 and 4. Steve Post, Jason Toy, and Brienne Pedigo had the pit road duties for MRN.

Standings after the race

Drivers' Championship standings

Manufacturers' Championship standings

Note: Only the first 16 positions are included for the driver standings.

References

Pala Casino 400
Pala Casino 400
Pala Casino 400
NASCAR races at Auto Club Speedway